Saturation II (stylized in all caps) is the second studio album by American boy band Brockhampton, released on August 25, 2017. Production is primarily handled by Romil Hemnani, alongside production duo Q3 (composed of Jabari Manwa and Kiko Merley), Bearface, Kevin Abstract, and JOBA.

Background
With only a few months since the release of their debut album, Saturation (2017), the group revealed plans to release the sequel to the predecessor. The album's official cover art and tracklist was revealed on August 21, 2017.

Singles
The album was supported by four singles, "Gummy", "Swamp", "Junky" and "Sweet". The lead single, "Gummy" was released on August 2, 2017. The second single, "Swamp" was released on August 8, 2017. The third single, "Junky" was released on August 15, 2017. The fourth and final single, "Sweet", was released August 22, 2017, alongside "Follow", the lead single from the upcoming Saturation III. However, it was later revealed that "Follow" would not be on Saturation III.  As the four singles were released, they were accompanied by their own music videos.

Critical reception

Saturation II received general acclaim from music critics upon its release, with most favouring it over its predecessor. For Fact, Al Horner called the album "sublime", commenting that "on the adventurous, quietly subversive Saturation II, [Brockhampton] dare to imagine a better hip-hop world to blaze trails in". He however warned of a "suspicion that Brockhampton could do with reviewing their balance of quality versus quantity", criticizing "moments on Saturation II that reduce its pace to a drag like the sluggish 'Chick'".

Reviewing the album for AllMusic, Neil Z. Yeung wrote that "building upon the promise of its predecessor, II is another genre-blurring collection of thrills that's packed with even more wild energy and potential. The flurry of activity produced by this gang of strong personalities manages to be a cohesive and seamless experience."

In a positive review for Pitchfork, Matthew Strauss praised the group's "sleek and cool performance style" and "aggression and swagger", as well as noting that the group have "ameliorated some of their more glaring flaws that existed on their debut". However, Strauss criticized the group's chemistry, writing that "there are precious few moments where they complement each other or build on distinct themes", summarizing that "there remains a sense that no matter how cool BROCKHAMPTON sound, they prize coolness more than they prize breaking molds and taking risks to become something bigger."

For PopMatters, Christopher Thiessen praised the group for "creat[ing] a new offering that is equally refreshing and enjoyable by pretty much following their original formula to the letter". In a joint review of the trilogy's first two installments for Pretty Much Amazing, Mick Jacobs wrote that "Brockhampton understands how to get your attention: by addressing all the shit that's taking up yours right this moment", asserting that "where Saturation feels more upfront, II feels more mischievous, a willingness to twist things to their own perception".

Ryan Feyre wrote for The Young Folks that "much like on their previous album, Brockhampton brings versatility on every corner of Saturation II, and … they’ve even one-upped themselves". DJBooths Henry Solotaroff-Webber highlighted the tracks "Queer", "Junky" and "Summer" as highlights, concluding that "despite the wild, creative energy Saturation II embodies as they charge toward their final destinations, the album is far from slapdash, is mostly cohesive and has certainly yielded some diamonds".

Year-end rankings

Track listing

Notes
  signifies an additional producer
  signifies an additional drum programmer
 All tracks stylised in all caps. For example, "Gummy" is stylised as "GUMMY"

Personnel 
Brockhampton

 Kevin Abstract – performance (tracks 1–3, 5, 7–10, 12–15), additional production (tracks 12, 14), executive production, creative direction
 Ameer Vann – performance (tracks 1–5, 7, 9, 10, 12, 13, 15) 
 Dom McLennon – performance (tracks 1–3, 5, 7, 9, 10, 12–14)
 Matt Champion – performance (tracks 1–3, 5, 9, 10, 13)
 Merlyn Wood – performance (tracks 1, 2, 5, 10, 12, 13, 15)
 Russell "Joba" Boring – performance (tracks 1, 3, 5, 7, 10, 13, 15), additional production (tracks 1, 10), co-executive production, mixing, mastering
 Bearface – performance (tracks 8, 14–16), production (tracks 3, 15, 16)
 Romil Hemnani – production (tracks 1–4, 6–12, 14), additional drum programming (track 13), co-executive production, recording engineering
 Q3 – additional production (track 1, 10)
 Jabari Manwa – production (tracks 5, 7, 14), additional production (track 2), additional drum programming (track 13)
 Kiko Merley – production (track 13)
 Henock Sileshi – creative direction, graphic design
 Ashlan Grey – photography
 Robert Ontenient – webmastering, performance (tracks 6, 11)

Additional personnel
 Ryan Beatty – additional vocals (track 2)
 Dijon – additional vocals (track 16)
 Nick Lenzini – creative assistance
 Kevin Doan – creative assistance

Charts

References 

2017 albums
Brockhampton (band) albums
Empire Distribution albums
Sequel albums